Dischistodus prosopotaenia, also known as honey-head damsel and honey-breast damsel, is a species of damselfish. It is native to the eastern Indian Ocean and western Pacific. The fish usually has a white breast, but there is a yellow-breasted variant that also has a black blotch on each side. The fish lives in lagoons and reefs.

References

External links
 

prosopotaenia
Taxa named by Pieter Bleeker
Fish described in 1852